The discography of English rock band The Psychedelic Furs consists of eight studio albums, 22 singles, six compilation albums, and two live albums.

The Psychedelic Furs formed in 1977 and released their eponymous debut album in 1980. It reached number 18 on the UK Albums Chart and number 140 on the US Billboard 200.
The band's second album, Talk Talk Talk, followed in 1981. It reached the top 10 of the charts in New Zealand and contained the band's first two charting UK singles, "Dumb Waiters" and "Pretty in Pink".
The band released its third album, Forever Now, in 1982. It featured the single "Love My Way", which nearly reached the top 40 in both the US and the UK.

Mirror Moves, the band's fourth album, was released in 1984 and peaked at number 15 in the UK and number 43 in the US. It included the charting singles "Heaven", "The Ghost in You", and "Heartbeat". In 1986, the band re-recorded "Pretty in Pink" for the soundtrack to the film of the same name, leaving them poised for their highest-profile release, 1987's Midnight to Midnight, which peaked at number 12 in the UK and number 29 in the US, thus becoming the highest-charting album of the band's career.  This was followed the next year with the band's first "hits" compilation, All of This and Nothing, and the single "All That Money Wants".

The Furs released two more studio albums: Book of Days in 1989, and World Outside in 1991, then quietly went on hiatus while singer Richard Butler began work on a solo project which evolved into the band Love Spit Love. The Psychedelic Furs reformed in 2000 and have continued to tour and perform ever since.  In 2001, they released Beautiful Chaos: Greatest Hits Live, which also featured one new studio recording, "Alive (For Once in My Lifetime)", as well as a DVD version of the performance, titled Live from the House of Blues. The band released Made of Rain, their first album in 29 years, on 31 July 2020. It was preceded by the single "Don't Believe".

Albums

Studio albums

Live albums

Compilation albums

Video albums

Singles

Notes
A ^ The Billboard Modern Rock chart was established in 1988.
B ^ This version also appeared later as a bonus track on some editions of Midnight to Midnight.
C ^ Promotional single only.

Music videos
 "We Love You" (1980)
 "Sister Europe" (1980)
 "Pretty in Pink" (1981)
 "Dumb Waiters" (1981)
 "Love My Way" (1982)
 "Sleep Comes Down" (1982)
 "Run and Run" (1983)
 "Danger" (1983)
 "Heaven" (1984)
 "The Ghost in You" (1984)
 "Here Come Cowboys" (1984)
 "Pretty in Pink" (1986)
 "Heartbreak Beat" (1987)
 "Angels Don't Cry" (1987)
 "All That Money Wants" (1988)
 "House" (1990)
 "Until She Comes" (1991)
 "Don't Be a Girl" (1991)
 "Alive (For Once in My Lifetime)" (2001)
 "Come All Ye Faithful" (2020)
 "Wrong Train" (2021)

References

External links

Discographies of British artists
Rock music group discographies
New wave discographies